Berclair may refer to:
 Berclair, Memphis, a district of Memphis, Tennessee, United States
 Berclair, Mississippi, an unincorporated community in the United States
 Berclair, Texas, an unincorporated community in the United States